Geneva County School District is a school district in Geneva County, Alabama, headquartered in Hartford.

Schools

High Schools
 Geneva County High School
 Geneva Regional Career Technical Center (G-TECH)
 Samson High School
 Slocomb High School

Middle Schools
 Geneva County Middle School
 Samson Middle School
 Slocomb Middle School

Elementary Schools
 Geneva County Elementary School
 Samson Elementary School
 Slocomb Elementary School

References

External links
 

School districts in Alabama